Maiden is a town in Catawba and Lincoln counties in the U.S. state of North Carolina. The population was 3,310 at the 2010 census.

Maiden was the first public high school in the state with an observatory and is currently home to an Apple iCloud Data Center, covering .

The Catawba County portion of Maiden is part of the Hickory–Lenoir–Morganton Metropolitan Statistical Area, while the Lincoln County portion is part of the Charlotte-Concord-Gastonia Metropolitan Area.

History 
"The Biggest Little Football Town in the World" (as it has long called itself) was incorporated on March 7, 1883 as a cotton mill site, and a trading center.  The name "Maiden" most likely is Native American in origin.

Historians claim that the town was named after the native-grown "Maidencane" grass, which is found throughout the township to this day.

The David F. Propst House, Memorial Reformed Church, Miller–Cansler House, Franklin D. Reinhardt and Harren–Hood Farms, William Pinckney Reinhardt House, and Salem Union Church and Cemetery are listed on the National Register of Historic Places.

Geography
Maiden is located in southern Catawba County, with a small portion extending south into Lincoln County. U.S. Route 321 Business passes through the center of town as Main Street, while current U.S. Route 321, a four-lane expressway, runs southwest of the town, with access from Exit 33 west of the town and from Exit 28 in Lincoln County.

Demographics

2020 census

As of the 2020 United States census, there were 3,736 people, 1,107 households, and 841 families residing in the town.

2010 census
As of the census of 2010, there were 3,327 people, 1,187 households, and 848 families residing in the town. The population density was 602.3 people per square mile (267.9/km2). There were 1,258 housing units at an average density of 265.8 per square mile (102.7/km2). The racial makeup of the town was 80.04% White, 14.72% African American, 0.37% Native American, 0.82% Asian, 0.30% Pacific Islander, 2.71% from other races, and 1.04% from two or more races. Hispanic or Latino of any race were 5.73% of the population.

There were 1,187 households, out of which 29.3% had children under the age of 18 living with them, 55.4% were married couples living together, 11.9% had a female householder with no husband present, and 28.5% were non-families. 24.9% of all households were made up of individuals, and 11.3% had someone living alone who was 65 years of age or older. The average household size was 2.47 and the average family size was 2.95.

In the town, the population was spread out, with 21.7% under the age of 18, 9.6% from 18 to 24, 32.8% from 25 to 44, 22.5% from 45 to 64, and 13.5% who were 65 years of age or older. The median age was 36 years. For every 100 females, there were 110.0 males. For every 100 females age 18 and over, there were 112.7 males.

The median income for a household in the town was $35,417, and the median income for a family was $44,063. Males had a median income of $29,695 versus $21,594 for females. The per capita income for the town was $19,026. About 7.6% of families and 8.9% of the population were below the poverty line, including 12.7% of those under age 18 and 10.8% of those age 65 or over.

Notable people
 Cherie Berry, former North Carolina Commissioner of Labor
 Dennis Hargrove Cooke, former president of what is now East Carolina University
 Caleb Farley, current NFL cornerback
 Hank Parker, professional bass fisherman
 Kevin Wilson, college football coach

References

External links
 Town website

Towns in Catawba County, North Carolina
Towns in Lincoln County, North Carolina